The fourth season of Reba, an American television sitcom series, aired on The WB from September 17, 2004 to May 20, 2005. The season consisted of 22 episodes. 

The show was broadcast during 2004–05 television season on Fridays at 9 pm. The season averaged 4.3 million viewers, up from the third season average. The entire season was released on DVD in North America on November 14, 2006.

Main Cast
 Reba McEntire as Reba Hart
 Christopher Rich as Brock Hart
 Melissa Peterman as Barbara Jean Hart
 JoAnna Garcia as Cheyenne Montgomery
 Steve Howey as Van Montgomery
 Scarlett Pomers as Kyra Hart
 Mitch Holleman as Jake Hart

Episodes

Home media

References

2004 American television seasons
2005 American television seasons
Reba (TV series) seasons